"Never Ending" is a song first recorded by Elvis Presley and released as a single in 1964.

Background

Elvis Presley recorded it in May 1963 and first released it in July 1964 on the RCA 45rpm single 47-8400 with "Such a Night" on the other side. In 1967 the song was included as a bonus track on Presley's soundtrack LP Double Trouble.

Writing and recording 
The song was written by Buddy Kaye and Phil Springer. It was published by Elvis Presley's company Gladys Music, Inc.

Presley recorded it on May 26, 1963, during the May 26–27 studio sessions for RCA at RCA's Studio B in Nashville, Tennessee.

Track listing 

7" single
 "Such a Night" (2:57)
 "Never Ending" (1:58)

Charts

References

External links 
 Elvis Presley With The Jordanaires - Such A Night at Discogs

1964 songs
1964 singles
Elvis Presley songs
Songs with lyrics by Buddy Kaye
Songs with lyrics by Philip Springer